Harry Patrick Saunders (16 March 191313 May 1967) was Archdeacon of Macclesfield from 1965 until 1967.

Saudners was educated at Hanley Castle Grammar School, King's College London, and St Stephen's House and St Catherine's Society, Oxford. He gained an Oxford Master of Arts (MA Oxon) and a Bachelor of Divinity (BD). He was ordained in 1936 and was successively:Chaplain and Lecturer at St Stephen's House, (Vice-Principal, 1938–49); Chaplain of St Edmund Hall, Oxford, 1936–46; Priest in charge of St Peter's, Shrewsbury and an RAF Chaplain, 1939–45; Chaplain of Magdalen College, Oxford, 1946–49; Vicar of St Andrew's, West Bromwich, 1949–51; Vicar of St Mary's, Kingswinford, 1951–56; a Lecturer at Queen's College, Birmingham, 1949–56; a Canon Residentiary of Ely Cathedral and Principal of Ely Theological College, 1956; and Vicar of Holy Trinity, Oswestry, 1957–64. He died in post as Archdeacon of Macclesfield.

References

1913 births
People educated at Hanley Castle High School
Alumni of King's College London
Alumni of St Catherine's College, Oxford
Alumni of St Stephen's House, Oxford
Faculty and staff of Ely Theological College
Archdeacons of Macclesfield
1967 deaths
20th-century English Anglican priests